Wilfredo Hernández (25 May 1950 - 19 February 1990) was a Puerto Rican actor.

Filmography

Films
The French Connection (1971) - (uncredited)
Marathon Man (1976) - Street Gang #5
Short Eyes (1977) - Cha Cha
Oliver's Story (1978) - Community Activist
Deal of the Century (1983) - Rojas
8 Million Ways to Die (1986) - Hector Lopez

Television
Voyagers! (1982) - Manuel
Tales of the Gold Monkey (1982) - Moro Aid
Hill Street Blues (1985) - Santiago's Buddy
Stingray (1985, TV Movie) - Purser
Matlock (1988-1989)
Falcon Crest (1989) - Francisco
El Diablo (1990, TV Movie) - El Matador
Adam 12 (1990, TV Series) - Gunman (final appearance)

References

External links

1950 births
1990 deaths
20th-century American male actors
People from Santurce, Puerto Rico
Puerto Rican male television actors
Puerto Rican male film actors